Just Any Woman (Spanish: Una mujer cualquiera) is a 1949 Spanish drama film directed by Rafael Gil and starring María Félix, Antonio Vilar and Mary Delgado.

Synopsis 
A woman who is alone tries to get ahead on her own, but precisely her beauty hinders her because all men see her as an instrument of pleasure, and the only way out of her is to "do the street". She then meets Luis, who is going to get her into a big mess, turning her life into a frenetic obstacle course.

Cast
 María Félix as Nieves Blanco  
 Antonio Vilar as Luis  
 Mary Delgado as Isabel  
 Juan Espantaleón as Comisario  
 José Nieto as Vecino  
 Juan de Landa as Padre de Luis  
 Manolo Morán as Taxista  
 Eduardo Fajardo as Ricardo 
 Fernando Fernández de Córdoba as Doctor 
 Ángel de Andrés as Camionero  
 Carolina Giménez as Rosa  
 Ricardo Acero as Viajero tren 
 Julia Caba Alba as Ofelia  
 María Isbert as Pasajera tren 
 Félix Fernández as Julio  
 Rafael Bardem as Diseñador de moda 
 José Prada as Policía tren  
 Manuel Requena as Sereno  
 Manuel Aguilera as Ayudante comisario 
 Luis Rivera 
 Arturo Marín as Revisor tren  
 Manuel San Román
 Francisco Bernal as Manuel  
 Tomás Blanco as Marido de Nieves  
 Manuel Guitián as Fidel  
 Casimiro Hurtado as Mecánico  
 Julia Lajos as Tía Pilar  
 Santiago Rivero as Ramón  
 Emilio Santiago as Recepcionista hotel

References

Bibliography 
 Bentley, Bernard. A Companion to Spanish Cinema. Boydell & Brewer 2008.

External links 
 

1949 drama films
Spanish drama films
1949 films
1940s Spanish-language films
Films directed by Rafael Gil
Suevia Films films
Spanish black-and-white films
1940s Spanish films